221628 Hyatt, provisional designation , is a background asteroid on an inclined, comet-like orbit in the outer regions of the asteroid belt, approximately  in diameter. It was discovered on 26 December 2006, by Alex Gibbs, an American software engineer with the Catalina Sky Survey, who named it after his father and renowned physicist Hyatt M. Gibbs.

Orbit and classification 

Hyatt is a non-family asteroid from the main belt's background population. It orbits the Sun in the outer asteroid belt at a distance of 2.4–3.9 AU once every 5 years and 6 months (2,025 days; semi-major axis of 3.13 AU). Its orbit has an eccentricity of 0.25 and a notable inclination of 32° with respect to the ecliptic. While still considered a main-belt asteroid, Hyatt blurs the distinction between asteroids and comets due to its relatively high inclination and a Tisserand's parameter of 2.929, which already enters the territory of Jupiter-family comets.

The body's observation arc begins with a precovery taken by LONEOS in December 2000, or six years prior to its official discovery observation at Catalina.

Physical characteristics 

Hyatt spectral type is unknown. It has an absolute magnitude of 14.4.

Diameter and albedo 

Hyatt has not been observed by any of the space-based surveys such as the Infrared Astronomical Satellite IRAS, the Japanese Akari satellite, and NASA's Wide-field Infrared Survey Explorer with its subsequent NEOWISE mission. Based on a generic magnitude-to-diameter conversion, it measures approximately 7.4 kilometers in diameter for an absolute magnitude of 14.4, and an assumed albedo of 0.057. This is a typical value for carbonaceous C-type asteroids, which are the dominant type in the outer asteroid belt.

Rotation period 

As of 2018, no rotational lightcurve of Hyatt has been obtained from photometric observations. The body's rotation period, pole and shape remain unknown.

Naming 

This minor planet was named by the discoverer after his father, Hyatt M. Gibbs (1938–2012), who was a physicist and professor at the University of Arizona College of Optical Sciences. Gibbs is known for his research on quantum optics and received several awards. The official naming citation was published by the Minor Planet Center on 3 July 2012, just two months before he died on 3 September 2012.

References

External links 
 Hyatt M. Gibbs, Franklin Institute Awards, Franklin Laureate Database
 Asteroid Lightcurve Database (LCDB), query form (info )
 Dictionary of Minor Planet Names, Google books
 Asteroids and comets rotation curves, CdR – Observatoire de Genève, Raoul Behrend
 Discovery Circumstances: Numbered Minor Planets (220001)-(225000) – Minor Planet Center
 
 

221628
Discoveries by Alex R. Gibbs
Named minor planets
20061226